Nicole Struse (born 31 May 1971 in Haan, North Rhine Westphalia) is a German table tennis player, who won several national contests and reached round three with Elke Wosik in the Women's Doubles Competition at the 2004 Summer Olympics. She represented her native country at four consecutive Summer Olympics, starting in 1992. 1995 she was ranked no 1 in the European ranking list. 2004 she won the Europe Top-12 table tennis tournament. After winning the eight German single championship  she replaced Hilde Bussmann and Trude Pritzi as new record holder in 2005. 2006 she and Wu Jiaduo won the German double championship. Struse ist right-hander, her strength is the offence. Recently, in March 2009, she was sixth of the German ranking. After that she was not ranked any more because of having not taken part in enough table tennis games during the last twelve months.

Associations 
Nicole Struse belonged to the following associations:
 SSVg Haan (from 1980)
 TTC Fortuna Solingen
 DSC Kaiserberg (1985–1986)
 Weiß-Rot-Weiß Kleve (1986–1987)
 Spvg Steinhagen (1987–1994)
 TSG Dülmen (1994–1997)
 Assistance Coesfeld (1997–1998)
 Montpellier TT (Frankreich) (1999–2000)
 FSV Kroppach (2000–2009)
 SV Böblingen (2009-????)

Private life 

On 1 May 2000  Struse became a member of the “Sportfördergruppe” of the "Federal Defence Force" of Germany in Mainz.

Literature 
 Rahul Nelson: Energiegeladenes Temperamentbündel auf dem Weg nach oben: Nicole Struse, Magazine DTS, 1990/6 S.36-38
 Manfred Schillings: Auf dem Gipfel des Erfolges, Bericht über die dreifache Europameisterin 1996, Magazine DTS, 1996/6 S.8-9
 Rahul Nelson: Das Leben der Nicole Struse (4 parts series)
 Teil 1: Allein unter Jungs, Magazine DTS, 1996/7 S.7-9
 Teil 2: Lehrjahre sind keine Mädchenjahre, Magazine DTS, 1996/9 S.36-38
 Teil 3: School is out forever, Magazine DTS, 1996/10 S.50-52
 Teil 4: Auf dem Gipfel Europas, Magazine DTS, 1996/11 S.26-28

See also
 List of table tennis players

References

External links 
 Entry in the ITTF-Datenbank
 Report in Tischtennis Inside

1971 births
Living people
People from Haan
Sportspeople from Düsseldorf (region)
German female table tennis players
Olympic table tennis players of Germany
Table tennis players at the 1992 Summer Olympics
Table tennis players at the 1996 Summer Olympics
Table tennis players at the 2000 Summer Olympics
Table tennis players at the 2004 Summer Olympics